The Fifth Republic is France's current republican system of government. It was established on 4 October 1958 by Charles de Gaulle under the Constitution of the Fifth Republic. The Fifth Republic emerged from the collapse of the Fourth Republic, replacing the former parliamentary republic with a semi-presidential (or dual-executive) system that split powers between a president as head of state and a prime minister as head of government. De Gaulle, who was the first French president elected under the Fifth Republic in December 1958, believed in a strong head of state, which he described as embodying  ("the spirit of the nation").

The Fifth Republic is France's third-longest-lasting political regime, after the hereditary, feudal monarchy of the Ancien Régime and the parliamentary Third Republic (1870–1940). The Fifth Republic will overtake that as the second-longest French regime and the longest-lasting French republic on 11 August 2028 if it remains unreplaced.

Origins 

The trigger for the collapse of the French Fourth Republic was the Algiers crisis of 1958. France was still a colonial power, although conflict and revolt had begun the process of decolonization. French West Africa, French Indochina, and French Algeria still sent representatives to the French parliament under systems of limited suffrage in the French Union. Algeria in particular, despite being the colony with the largest French population, saw rising pressure for separation from Metropolitan France. The situation was complicated by those in Algeria, such as European settlers, native Jews, and Harkis (native Muslims who were loyal to France) who wanted to maintain the union with France. The Algerian War was not just a separatist movement but had elements of a civil war. Further complications came when a section of the French Army rebelled and openly backed the  movement to defeat separation. Charles de Gaulle, who had retired from politics a decade before, placed himself in the midst of the crisis, calling on the nation to suspend the government and create a new constitutional system. De Gaulle was carried to power by the inability of the parliament to choose a government, popular protest, and the last parliament of the Fourth Republic voting for their dissolution and the convening of a constitutional convention.

The Fourth Republic suffered from a lack of political consensus, a weak executive, and governments forming and falling in quick succession since 1946. With no party or coalition able to sustain a parliamentary majority, prime ministers found themselves unable to risk their political position with unpopular reforms.

De Gaulle and his supporters proposed a system of strong presidents elected for seven-year terms. The president, under the proposed constitution, would have executive powers to run the country in consultation with a prime minister whom he would appoint. On 1 June 1958, Charles de Gaulle was appointed head of the government; on 3 June 1958, a constitutional law empowered the new government to draft a new constitution of France, and another law granted Charles de Gaulle and his cabinet the power to rule by decree for up to six months, except on certain matters related to the basic rights of citizens (criminal law, etc.). These plans were approved by more than 80% of those who voted in the referendum of 28 September 1958. The new constitution was signed into law on 4 October 1958. Since each new constitution established a new republic, France moved from the Fourth to the Fifth Republic.

The new constitution contained transitional clauses (articles 90–92) extending the period of rule by decree until the new institutions were operating. René Coty remained president of the Republic until the new president was proclaimed. On 21 December 1958, Charles de Gaulle was elected president of France by an electoral college. The provisional constitutional commission, acting in lieu of the constitutional council, proclaimed the results of the election on 9 January 1959. The new president began his office on that date, appointing Michel Debré as prime minister.

The 1958 constitution also replaced the French Union with the French Community, which allowed fourteen member territories (excluding Algeria) to assert their independence. 1960 became known as the "Year of Africa" because of this wave of newly independent states. Algeria became independent on 5 July 1962.

Evolution 

The president was initially elected by an electoral college but in 1962 de Gaulle proposed that the president be directly elected by the citizens and held a referendum on the change. Although the method and intent of de Gaulle in that referendum were contested by most political groups except for the Gaullists, the change was approved by the French electorate. The Constitutional Council declined to rule on the constitutionality of the referendum.

The president is now elected every five years, changed from seven by a constitutional referendum in 2000, to reduce the probability of cohabitation due to former differences in the length of terms for the National Assembly and presidency. The president is elected in one or two rounds of voting: if one candidate gets a majority of votes in the first round that person is president-elect; if no one gets a majority in the first round, the two candidates with the greatest number of votes go to a second round.

Two major changes occurred in the 1970s regarding constitutional checks and balances. Traditionally, France operated according to parliamentary supremacy: no authority was empowered to rule on whether statutes passed by Parliament respected the constitutional rights of the citizens. In 1971, however, the Constitutional Council, arguing that the preamble of the constitution referenced the rights defined in the 1789 Declaration of the Rights of Man and of the Citizen and the preamble of the 1946 constitution, concluded that statutes must respect these rights and so declared partially unconstitutional a statute because it violated freedom of association. Only the President of the Republic, the Prime Minister, or the president of either house of Parliament could ask for a constitutional review  a statute was signed into law—which greatly reduces the likelihood of such a review if all these officeholders happened to be from the same side of politics, which was the case at the time. Then in 1974, a constitutional amendment widened this prerogative to 60 members of the National Assembly or 60 members of the senate. From that date, the opposition has been able to have controversial new statutes examined for constitutionality.

Presidents of the Fifth Republic 

Source:

President image gallery

Prime Ministers of the Fifth Republic 

Source:

Institutions of the Fifth Republic

See also 
1958 Guinean constitutional referendum
French colonial empire
List of French possessions and colonies
Politics of France

Notes

References

Further reading 

 Atkin, Nicholas. The Fifth French Republic (European History in Perspective) (2005)  excerpt and text search
 Bell, David S. and John Gaffney, eds. The Presidents of the French Fifth Republic (Palgrave Macmillan, 2013)
 Bell,David, et al. A Biographical Dictionary of French Political Leaders since 1870 (1990)
 Bell, David S., and Byron Criddle. Exceptional Socialists: The Case of the French Socialist Party (2014) 
 Berstein, Serge, and Jean-Pierre Rioux. The Pompidou Years, 1969–1974 (The Cambridge History of Modern France) (2000) excerpt
 Brouard, Sylvain et al. The French Fifth Republic at Fifty: Beyond Stereotypes (French Politics, Society and Culture) (2009)
 Chabal, Emile, ed. France since the 1970s: History, Politics and Memory in an Age of Uncertainty (2015)  Excerpt
 Cole, Alistair. François Mitterrand: A study in political leadership (1994)
 Corbett, Anne, and Bob Moon, eds. Education in France: continuity and change in the Mitterrand years 1981–1995 (Routledge, 2002)
 Fenby, Jonathan The General: Charles de Gaulle and the France He Saved (2010) pp. 375–635.
 Fenby, Jonathan France: A Modern History from the Revolution to the War with Terror (2016) pp. 359–484
 Gaffney, John. France in the Hollande presidency: The unhappy republic (Springer, 2015).
 Gaffney, John. Political Leadership in France. From Charles de Gaulle to Nicolas Sarkozy (Palgrave Macmillan, 2010)
 
 Jackson, Julian. De Gaulle (2018) 887pp; the most recent major biography
 Kuhn, Raymond. "Mister unpopular: François Hollande and the exercise of presidential leadership, 2012–14." Modern & Contemporary France 22.4 (2014): 435-457. online
 Kulski, W. W. De Gaulle and the World: The Foreign Policy of the Fifth French Republic (1966) online free to borrow
 Lewis-Beck, Michael S., et al. eds. French Presidential Elections (Palgrave Macmillan; 2012)
 Nester, William R. De Gaulle's Legacy: The Art of Power in France's Fifth Republic (2014)
 Praud, Jocelyne and Sandrine Dauphin, eds. Parity Democracy: Women's Political Representation in Fifth Republic France (2011)
 Raymond, Gino G., The French Communist Party During Fifth Republic: A Crisis of Leadership and Ideology. (Palgrave Macmillan, 2005)
 Rogoff, Martin A. French Constitutional Law: Cases and Materials (Durham, Carolina Academic Press, 2010.
 Short, Philip. Mitterrand: A Study in Ambiguity (2013)
 Thody, Philip. The Fifth French Republic: Presidents, Politics and Personalities: A Study of French Political Culture (1998)  excerpt and text search
 Wall, Irwin. France Votes: The Election of François Hollande (Palgrave Macmillan, 2014.)
 Williams, Charles. The Last Great Frenchman: A Life of General De Gaulle (1997)

 In French

External links

 LegiFrance: French Constitution of 1958 

 
Contemporary French history
Republic 5
Republicanism in France
1958 establishments in France
States and territories established in 1958
Republic 5
21st century in France